National Route 10 (officially, PY10, simply known as Ruta Diez) is a highway in Paraguay, which runs from Naranjal to Paraguarí, connecting national routes PY06 and PY01.
Previously, the route that connects Puerto Rosario with Salto del Guairá was called Route 10, but with Resolution 1090/19 of the MOPC (Ministry of Public Works and Communications), the section from Puerto Rosario to San Estanislao is now part of route PY22, and the section from San Estanislao to Salto del Guairá is now part of route PY03.

Distances, cities and towns

The following table shows the distances traversed by National Route 10 in each different department, showing cities and towns that it passes by (or near).

10